is the Germanic variant of major general, used in a number of Central and Northern European countries .

Austria

Belgium

Denmark

 is the second lowest general officer rank in the Royal Danish Army and Royal Danish Air Force. As a two-star rank it is the equivalent to the rank of counter admiral in the Royal Danish Navy.

The rank is rated OF-7 within NATO. It has the grade of M404 within the Ministry of Defence's pay structure. The rank of major general is reserved for the Chief of the army and air force.

History
On 25 May 1671, the ranks were codified, by King Christian V, with the publication of the Danish order of precedence. Here generals of the branch were placed below Lieutenant field marshal, and above the noble rank of Count and the military rank of Lieutenant general.

As part of the Army Reform of 1867, the ranks of Major, Lieutenant colonel were removed and only a single "General" rank was kept. After the 1880 reform, the general officer ranks were reintroduced. Commanding generals of the 1st and 2nd General Command were made Lieutenant generals while everyone else were made Major general.

Insignia
The first official uniform was instituted on 29 September 1737. The first few uniform designs have not survived, though they were likely red, highly ornamented coats without collar. The red coat remained until 1768, when Comte de Saint-Germain instituted white uniforms for generals, these were however removed shortly after, in 1769. In 1772, the first real ranks were introduced to the Danish Army; these were gold rings on the cuffs, with three for full generals, two for Lieutenant generals, and one for major generals. This uniform saw a number of changes until 1785, when the cuff ranks were removed.

In 1801, new uniforms were introduced for the whole army. Along with the new uniforms, epaulette ranks were introduced for officers, with generals wearing six-pointed stars on their epaulettes. The general ranks remained largely unchanged from their introduction until 1979, and the adoption of NATO STANAG 2116. The adoption created the new rank of Brigadier general, which would receive the one star, meaning the major general would receive two stars.

Rank insignia

Finland

Germany

It is the third-highest general officer rank in the German Army (Heer) and German Air Force (Luftwaffe). This rank is also used in the Austrian Armed Forces, but is abbreviated as GenMjr.

Historically, German Army ranks for its generals prior to 1945 were offset by one from those of most other major European armies. Thus, prior to 1945, the Generalmajor rank in the German Army was equivalent to the brigadier general rank in other armies, and so forth.

Generalmajor in modern Germany
The rank is rated OF-7 in NATO, and is grade B7 in the pay rules of the Federal Ministry of Defence. It is equivalent to Konteradmiral in the German Navy (Marine) or to Generalstabsarzt, and Admiralstabsarzt in the Zentraler Sanitätsdienst der Bundeswehr.

On the shoulder straps (Heer, Luftwaffe) there are two golden pips (stars) in golden oak leaves.

Bundeswehr sequence of ranks ascending

Generalmajor in East Germany
Generalmajor was in the so-called "armed organs of the GDR", represented by Ministry of National Defence, and Ministry for State Security, the lowest general officer rank, comparable to the one-star rank in many NATO-Armed forces (Rangcode OF-6). This was in reference to Soviet military doctrine and in line with other armed forces of the Warsaw Pact.

The equivalent rank of the Volksmarine (GDR Navy) was the Konteradmiral, often called simply Herr Admiral for short.

Generalmajor of the Wehrmacht
Generalmajor was in the German Reich and Nazi Germany the lowest general officer rank, comparable to the one-star rank in many NATO-Armed forces (Rangcode OF-6). It was equivalent to Konteradmiral in the Kriegsmarine, and SS-Brigadeführer in the Waffen-SS until 1945.

Rank insignia Generalmajor / Konteradmiral

Sequence of ranks ascending

Norway

Sweden

See also
 Comparative officer ranks of World War I
 Comparative officer ranks of World War II
 Ranks of the National People's Army

References

Bibliography
 
 
 
 
 
 
 

Military ranks of Germany

de:Generalmajor